Cryptoblabes angustipennella, the earhead caterpillar, is a moth of the family Pyralidae. It was first described by Émile Louis Ragonot in 1888. It is found in India and Sri Lanka. The caterpillar is a pest of Eleusine coracana.

References

Moths of Asia
Moths described in 1888
Phycitini